is a Prefectural Natural Park in southwest Kagoshima Prefecture, Japan. Established in 1953, the park spans the municipalities of Makurazaki and Minamisatsuma.

See also
 National Parks of Japan

References

Parks and gardens in Kagoshima Prefecture
Protected areas established in 1953
1953 establishments in Japan